The Dead Word is the fourth full-length studio album by the progressive metal band Deadsoul Tribe, released on 11 November 2005 by InsideOut Music.

Track listing 
 "Prelude: Time and Pressure" − 1:40
 "A Flight on an Angels Wing" − 4:31
 "To My Beloved…" − 5:56
 "Don't You Ever Hurt?" − 4:56
 "Some Sane Advice" − 3:57
 "Let the Hammer Fall" − 4:03
 "Waiting in Line" − 6:34
 "Someday" − 1:34
 "My Dying Wish" − 4:01
 "A Fistful of Bended Nails" − 5:25
 "The Long Ride Home" − 4:20

Credits 
 Devon Graves − lead vocals, guitar, flute
 Roland Ivenz − bass
 Adel Moustafa − drums
 Roland Kerschbaumer − guitar

References 

Deadsoul Tribe albums
2005 albums
Inside Out Music albums